Isaac Ifeoluwa Foloronso Olushore Ogundere (born 6 November 2002) is an English professional footballer who plays as a defender for AFC Wimbledon.

Career

AFC Wimbledon
Having previously captained the AFC Wimbledon under-18 after being picked up from Hayes & Yeading, Ogundere signed a first professional contract with AFC Wimbledon in July 2021.

He made his professional debut in the EFL Cup for AFC Wimbledon at home at Plough Lane against Gillingham on 9 August 2022. Shortly after on August 16, 2022 he made his League Two debut for AFC Wimbledon as a second half substitute away at Mansfield.

Loans
Ogundere signed for Leatherhead on loan at the start of the 2021-22 season. Ogundere scored for Leatherhead in the FA Cup against Amersham Town in October 2021. He later spent time on loan at Potters Bar Town during the 2021-22 season.

In February 2023, Ogundere joined Dartford in the National League South for the rest of the 2022-23 season.

Career statistics

References

2002 births
Living people
AFC Wimbledon players
Leatherhead F.C. players
Potters Bar Town F.C. players
Dartford F.C. players
Isthmian League players
English footballers